The Boycotted Baby is a 1917 American silent comedy film directed by and starring Oliver Hardy.

Plot
Babe (Oliver Hardy) and Kate (Kate Price) are sweethearts.  They live in the rather conservative town of Cordeliaville where there are laws which prohibit both romancing and babies. A new mother arrives in Cordeliaville and notices the sign.  Rather than leaving town, the mother leaves her baby... at Kate's doorstep. Kate and Babe try to hide the baby which, in turn, gets passed from person to person until it is reunited with the mother.

Cast
 Oliver Hardy as Babe (as Babe Hardy)
 Kate Price as Kate

See also
 List of American films of 1917

External links

kid Maintenance

1917 films
American silent short films
American black-and-white films
1917 comedy films
1917 short films
Films directed by Oliver Hardy
Silent American comedy films
American comedy short films
1910s American films
1910s English-language films